André Devauchelle (17 August 1904 – 22 December 1972) was a French racing cyclist. He rode in the 1927 Tour de France.

References

1904 births
1972 deaths
French male cyclists
Place of birth missing